Breathing Color is an American designer and supplier of award-winning digital art, founded in 2003. The company is focused on canvas coating products and increasing print efficiency in the physical format. Their system provides collaboration directly to the manufacturer, omitting some portions of the supply chain in distribution and development. The company sells through a network of international dealers that distribute, promote, and provide insightful details on the products. Test runs are completed often through this dealer network to determine the quality of Breathing Color's newest products.

History
Founded in January 2003 by a small group of art enthusiasts, the company stresses flexible creativity and experimentation in their palette of coatings, substrates, and physical print equipment. The current president is Nick M. Friend. Friend won Orange County's “Excellence in Entrepreneurship” award in 2007. He is followed by vice president of sales, Adam Hill, and national account manager Eric Lyons.
 
Breathing Color's sales and marketing headquarters is located in Austin, Texas.

Sponsorships
The company has sponsored a series of professional photographers, including:

 Martin Bailey – Professional photographer and educator
 Parish Kohanim – Canon print paster and explorer of light 
 Andy Katz – Professional photographer and educator
 Seth Resnick – Professional photographer and educator
 Tim Walden – Professional photographer and educator

References

External links
 Official Web Site

Companies based in Austin, Texas